Prior to its uniform adoption of proportional representation in 1999, the United Kingdom used first-past-the-post for the European elections in England, Scotland and Wales. The European Parliament constituencies used under that system were smaller than the later regional constituencies and only had one Member of the European Parliament each. The constituency of Thames Valley was one of them.

Boundaries
1979-1984: Beaconsfield; Chesham and Amersham; Eton and Slough; Spelthorne; Windsor and Maidenhead; Wokingham; Wycombe.

1984-1999: East Berkshire; Reading East; Reading West; Slough; Spelthorne; Windsor and Maidenhead; Wokingham.

Members of the European Parliament

Election results

References

European Parliament constituencies in England (1979–1999)
Politics of Berkshire
Politics of Surrey
1979 establishments in England
1999 disestablishments in England
Constituencies established in 1979
Constituencies disestablished in 1999